The qualification event for the 2008 World Wheelchair Curling Championship was held from November 5 to 9, 2007 in Inverness, Scotland. The event's two top finishers, Germany and China, both qualified to participate in the 2008 World Wheelchair Curling Championship. The two qualification spots were given to the top two teams at the conclusion of the round robin.

Teams

Round-robin standings

Round-robin results

Draw 1

Draw 2

Draw 3

Draw 4

Draw 5

Draw 6

Draw 7

Draw 8

Draw 9

Tiebreakers

External links

2007 in curling
Qualification for curling competitions
World Wheelchair Curling Championship